Hydnellum martioflavum is a species of tooth fungus in the family Bankeraceae, found in Europe and North America.

It was first described by Wally Snell, Kenneth A. Harrison, and Henry Jackson in 1962 as Hydnum martioflavum. Rudolph Arnold Maas Geesteranus transferred it to the genus Sarcodon in 1964. He considered his Sarcodon armeniacus, described the year previously, to be a synonym. The fungus was originally described from collections made in Quebec and Nova Scotia, Canada, growing under spruce and balsam fir. It is considered vulnerable in Switzerland.

References

External links

Fungi described in 1962
Fungi of Europe
Fungi of North America
martioflavum